Byun Jin-soo (born 1 April 1993) is a South Korean professional baseball pitcher who is currently playing for the Kia Tigers of KBO League. He graduated from Choongam High School (leading the school to victory in the 2011 Hwanggeumsajagi National High School Baseball Championship) and was selected for the Doosan Bears by a draft in 2012 (2nd draft, 2nd round). He pitches underhand, and his fast fastball (around 140km/h) and high-falling slider are his main weapons. His sinker and changeup are said to be his main weaknesses.

Career records

References

External links 

 Career statistics and player information from Korea Baseball Organization
 Byun Jin-soo at Doosan Bears Baseball Club

1993 births
Living people
Doosan Bears players
KBO League pitchers
People from Changwon
Sportspeople from South Gyeongsang Province